Mount Kolp is a mostly ice-free coastal mountain,  high, standing  west-northwest of Cape Laird, along the west side of the Ross Ice Shelf, Antarctica. It was named by the Advisory Committee on Antarctic Names for Lieutenant Colonel H.R. Kolp, United States Marine Corps, executive officer of U.S. Navy Squadron VX-6 in Antarctica during Operation Deep Freeze I (1955–56).

References

Mountains of the Ross Dependency
Shackleton Coast